This page provides statistics of the Mestaruussarja, the premier division of Finnish football, for the 1977 season.

Overview
It was contested by 12 teams, and Haka Valkeakoski won the championship.

League standings

Results

References
Finland - List of final tables (RSSSF)

Mestaruussarja seasons
Fin
Fin
1